Norman Reginald Warner, Baron Warner,  (born 8 September 1940) is a British member of the House of Lords. A career civil servant from 1960, he was created a life peer in 1998. He was Parliamentary Under-Secretary in the Department of Health from 2003 to 2007, and a Minister of State at the Department of Health from 2005 to 2007. He has also been an adviser to a number of consulting companies. On 19 October 2015, Lord Warner resigned the Labour whip and became a Non-affiliated member of the House of Lords.

Early life and education
Warner was born on 8 September 1940. He was educated at Dulwich College, an all-boys public school in Dulwich, London. He graduated from the University of California, Berkeley with a Master of Public Health degree. From 1983 to 1984 he was the Gwilym Gibbon Fellow at Nuffield College, Oxford.

Career
Following a career in the civil service in a variety of roles from 1960, Warner was Director of Social Services for Kent County Council between 1985 and 1991, and chair of the City and East London Family Services Authority 1991 to 1994. He chaired the National Inquiry into Selection, Development and Management of Staff in Children's Homes in 1992.

In 2010 Lord Warner declared he was a strategic advisor to PA Consulting Group, for "strategic advice relating to Middle East activities only".

In 2008 he told the House of Commons Public Administration Select Committee that he had "a contract with a particular part of DLA Piper concerned with infrastructure and public services and that requires me to give advice in those areas, including a bit of health regulation."
In 2009 he said he was "a paid adviser to the General Healthcare Group" as well as "the chairman of NHS London Development Agency".

Political career
He was created a Life Peer on 29 July 1998, taking the title Baron Warner, of Brockley in the London Borough of Lewisham. From 1997 to 1998 he was Senior Policy Adviser to Home Secretary Jack Straw, and remained an adviser to Government on family policy after being appointed to the House of Lords.

He was Parliamentary Under-Secretary of State in the Department of Health from 2003 to 2005, and a Minister of State at the Department of Health from 2005 to 2007. He was appointed to the Privy Council in June 2006, and was sworn in on 19 July 2006.

In August 2010, Lord Warner was appointed by the Coalition Government as a commissioner on the Commission on Funding of Care and Support, which was chaired by Andrew Dilnot. The commission was asked by the government to review the way in which social care is paid for in England. It recommended that people's lifetime costs should be capped, with the government paying any further costs above the level of the cap.
In June 2014, he was appointed as a Commissioner to oversee improvements in Birmingham City Council's Children's Social Care services, following a poor review by Professor Julian Le Grand.

In October 2015, Warner resigned the Labour whip in the House of Lords and became a Non-affiliated member. In a letter to the Labour leader, Jeremy Corbyn, he wrote that Labour was no longer "a credible party of government-in-waiting... Labour will only win another election with a policy approach that wins back people who have moved to voting Conservative and Ukip, as well as to Greens and SNP. Your approach is unlikely to achieve this shift."

NHS controversy

In April 2013, Lord Warner announced he would vote with the Conservatives and Liberal Democrats in a key vote in the House of Lords on proposed NHS regulations that Labour claimed would enable companies to bid for almost all health services.  He was the only Labour peer to do so.

In March 2014, Warner wrote an article for The Guardian newspaper suggesting that NHS users should pay £10 a month and £20 for every night in hospital. Labour swiftly rejected these ideas. Shadow Health Minister, Jamie Reed, commented: "This is not something Labour would ever consider. We believe in an NHS free at the point of use, and a Labour government will repeal David Cameron's NHS changes that put private profit before patient care."

Lord Warner is a director of Sage Advice Ltd, and an adviser to Xansa (a technology firm) and Byotrol (an antimicrobial company) – all of which sell or are hoping to sell services or products to the NHS, according to website Social Investigations. He also took up a position with Apax Partners – one of the leading private equity investors in healthcare, according to the Alliance for Lobbying Transparency.

Other interests
He has also held the Chair of the Youth Justice Board, National Council for Voluntary Organisations and the London Region Sports Board. In 2010, Warner was elected chair of the All-Party Parliamentary Humanist Group, becoming Vice Chair in 2015.

He is a member of the Advisory Council of Reform.

He is an Honorary Associate of the National Secular Society

References

External links
 Norman Warner: will a new Beveridge emerge?, 1 March 2012. Essay from The next ten years published by Reform.
 Why I, a Labour peer, am supporting a regulated market for NHS competition, Norman Warner, The Guardian, 23 April 2013.

1940 births
Labour Party (UK) life peers
Living people
Members of the Privy Council of the United Kingdom
Crossbench life peers
British civil servants
People educated at Dulwich College
Alumni of Nuffield College, Oxford
UC Berkeley School of Public Health alumni
Life peers created by Elizabeth II